Beschorneria is a  genus of succulent plants belonging to the family Asparagaceae, subfamily Agavoideae, native to semi-arid areas of Mexico and Central America. Marginally hardy, they may require winter protection in areas subject to frost.

Species
 Beschorneria albiflora Matuda  - Oaxaca, Chiapas, Guatemala, Honduras
 Beschorneria calcicola A.García-Mendoza   - Puebla, Oaxaca, Veracruz
 Beschorneria dubia Carrière - Tamaulipas
 Beschorneria rigida Rose  - Guanajuato, San Luis Potosí, Puebla
 Beschorneria septentrionalis A.García Mendoza   - Tamaulipas, Nuevo León
 Beschorneria tubiflora (Kunth & C.D.Bouché) Kunth - San Luis Potosí, Hidalgo
 Beschorneria wrightii Hook.f  - México State
 Beschorneria yuccoides K.Koch  - Hidalgo, Puebla, Veracruz

formerly included
Three names have been coined using the name Beschorneria (B. floribunda, B. multiflora, and B. parmentieri), all referring to the species now known as Furcraea parmentieri.  See Furcraea.

References

 Germplasm Resources Information Network: Beschorneria
International Plant Names Index (IPNI)

Asparagaceae genera
Agavoideae